A gear case, also known as a chain case or chainguard, is an enclosure for the bicycle chain and sprocket assemblages commonly employed by utility bicycles.  It serves to protect the cyclist from being soiled or trapped in the chain rings and tends to fully enclose the drive train. It may also contain an oil bath to keep the chain lubricated. Modern examples are usually moulded in plastic. Similar devices may be found in connection with chains used on larger vehicles and machinery.

Gallery

See also
 Luggage carrier

References

 bicycle glossary entry for "Chain case" from Sheldon Brown's website
 Sheldon Brown's bicycle glossary entry for "Gear case"
 Sheldon Brown's bicycle glossary entry for "Chainguard"

Bicycle parts